Sprawa pilota Maresza is a Polish film directed by Leonard Buczkowski released in 1956. Based on a novel by Janusz Meissner, which was inspired by actual events. One of the first Polish features filmed in color.

Cast 
 Wieńczysław Gliński - cpt. Piotr Maresz
 Alicja Raciszówna - Krystyna Flisakówna
 Lidia Wysocka - Mary Godzicka
 Leon Niemczyk - Surowiec
 Jerzy Michotek - Jan Flisak, co-pilot
 Bogdan Niewinowski - Józef Cygan
 Jerzy Kaczmarek - Włodzimierz Elmer
 Kazimierz Wilamowski - Hornowski

Awards 
 Złota Kaczka - best film of 1956

External links 
 

Polish drama films
Aviation films
Films set on airplanes
Films based on Polish novels
Polish action films
1950s action drama films